Mahdzir bin Khalid (Jawi: محاضر بن خالد; born 15 December 1960) is a Malaysian politician and teacher who served as the Minister of Rural Development in the Barisan Nasional (BN) administration under former Prime Minister Ismail Sabri Yaakob from August 2021 to the collapse of BN administration in November 2022, Minister of Education, Deputy Minister of Energy, Green Technology and Water in the BN administration under former Prime Minister Najib Razak and former Minister Maximus Ongkili from May 2013 to the collapse of the BN administration in May 2018, Chairman of the Tenaga Nasional Berhad (TNB) from May 2020 to October 2021, Member of Parliament (MP) for Padang Terap from May 2013 to November 2022, the 9th Menteri Besar of Kedah from December 2005 to March 2008, Member of the Kedah State Executive Council (EXCO) from March 2004 to his promotion to Menteri Besar in December 2005 and Member of the Kedah State Legislative Assembly (MLA) for Pedu from March 2004 to May 2013. He is a member of the United Malays National Organisation (UMNO), a component party of the BN coalition. He also served as the Vice President of UMNO from June 2018 to his defeat in the party elections in March 2023.

Political career
Mahdzir started his political career as a staffer and in 1999 became the political secretary to Deputy Prime Minister Abdullah Ahmad Badawi. In 2004 he was elected to the Kedah State Legislative Assembly for the rural seat of Pedu. In December 2005 he became the state's Chief Minister after his predecessor, Syed Razak Syed Zain Barakhbah, resigned because of ill health. Mahdzir had been acting in the position since July 2005.

Mahdzir's tenure as Menteri Besar came to an end after his BN Kedah state government was defeated in the 2008 election by the Pakatan Rakyat (PR) opposition coalition led by the Pan-Malaysian Islamic Party (PAS). Mahdzir became Barisan Nasional's opposition leader in the state assembly before moving to federal parliament in the 2013 election, winning the seat of Padang Terap from PAS. After the election he was appointed as Deputy Minister for Energy, Green Technology and Water in the government of Prime Minister Najib Razak.

Over a period of about 17 months between 2015-17, as Minister of Education, Mahdzir was pressured to award a contract for the provision of electricity to rural Sarawak schools to Jepak Holdings.

Jepak Holdings 
In late 2015, Saidi Bin Abang Samsudin and Rayyan Radzwill bin Abdullah proposed to the Ministry of Education that it award their company, Jepak Holdings Sdn Bhd, a contract to replace other contractors for the provision of maintenance of diesel electric generators at rural and interior Sarawak schools and install a hybrid solar voltaic system for RM1.25 billion.

As Minister of Education, Mahdzir did not favour the proposal as the Ministry’s technical experts doubted Jepak’s expertise and the Ministry had already planned to connect some of the schools to the electricity grid. Saidi and Rayyan then sought the assistance of Rosmah Mansor, wife of Prime Minister Najib Razak, to effect the contract. Saidi and Rayyan agreed to pay Rosmah 15% of the contract sum, or RM187.5 million, for her help. In December 2016, Rosmah called Mahdzir to urge him to award the contract. Eventually, the Ministry signed a contract with Jepak in June 2017. In September 2022, Rosmah was convicted in the High Court of Malaya of bribery in relation to the Jepak contract.

Election results

Honours
  :
  Knight Grand Companion of the Order of Loyalty to the Royal House of Kedah (SSDK) – Dato' Seri (2006)
  Grand Commander of the Order of Loyalty to Sultan Abdul Halim Mu'adzam Shah (SHMS) – Dato' Seri Diraja (2008)
  :
  Knight Commander of the Order of the Perak State Crown (DPMP) – Dato' (2003)

References

Living people
1960 births
Malaysian schoolteachers
People from Kedah
Malaysian people of Malay descent
Malaysian Muslims
United Malays National Organisation politicians
Education ministers of Malaysia
Government ministers of Malaysia
Members of the Dewan Rakyat
Chief Ministers of Kedah
Kedah state executive councillors
Members of the Kedah State Legislative Assembly
21st-century Malaysian politicians